Ivory Coast–Turkey relations are the foreign relations between Ivory Coast and Turkey.

Historical Relations 

For most of the 20th century, President Houphouët-Boigny’s and Turkey's foreign policy aligned: Both countries have been staunch supporters of Israel and considered the Soviet Union as a threat.

Bilateral relations became tense in the early 1960s when President Houphouët-Boigny assisted French nuclear testing in Algeria and refused to (1) condemn France for its response to Algerian War and (2) provide Algeria with any assistance. 

Relations became tense again in February 1986, when Houphouët-Boigny announced the decision to move his country's embassy from Tel Aviv to Jerusalem in exchange  for Israeli aid. This decision was in defiance of a 1980 United Nations Security Council resolution calling on all countries to withdraw their embassies from that city.

Presidential Visits

Economic Relations 
Trade volume between the two countries was 409.7 million USD in 2019 (Turkish exports/imports: 220.9/188.8 million USD).
There are direct flights from Istanbul to Abidjan since July 2012.

See also 

 Foreign relations of Ivory Coast
 Foreign relations of Turkey

References 

 
Turkey
Bilateral relations of Turkey